Somerville Independent School District is a public school district based in Somerville, Texas (USA). The district serves students in southern Burleson County.

Texas Education Agency ratings
In 2014, 2015, 2016 the school district was rated "improvement required" by the Texas Education Agency.

Arrests of teachers
In 2017, teacher and coach Mike Vela was arrested for the sexual assault of a child.

In 2018, teacher and coach Chris Coronado was arrested for improper relationship with a student.

Demographics
In 2018 about 24 percent of students were African American, a third were Hispanic, and 38.6 percent caucasian. In 2018, the school district was given a performance rating of 'D'. The Somerville ISD 'Student Achievement' score was a 60 out of 100.

Schools
Somerville High (Grades 7-12)
Somerville Elementary (Grades PK-5)

References

External links
Somerville ISD

School districts in Burleson County, Texas